Kevin Peponnet (born 31 January 1991 in Saint-Jean-de-Luz) is a French sailor. He is competing at the 2020 Summer Olympics in the 470 class together with Jeremie Mion. In 2018 they won the Sailing World Championships.

References

External links
 
 
 
 

1991 births
Living people
French male sailors (sport)
Olympic sailors of France
Sailors at the 2020 Summer Olympics – 470
People from Saint-Jean-de-Luz